Idlewild is a historic house in Port Gibson, Mississippi, U.S.. It has been listed on the National Register of Historic Places since July 22, 1979.

References

Houses on the National Register of Historic Places in Mississippi
Greek Revival houses in Mississippi
Houses completed in 1830
National Register of Historic Places in Claiborne County, Mississippi
Houses in Claiborne County, Mississippi